The discography of Jamaican reggae group Black Uhuru consists of at least 103 singles and EPs, 19 studio albums and at least 16 Live/Dub albums.

Singles and EPs
Black Uhuru have issued at least 103 singles and EPs.

Albums

Derrick "Duckie" Simpson, Michael Rose, Errol "Tarzan" Nelson
1977 – Love Crisis
1981 – Black Sounds of Freedom (Love Crisis re-edition)

Group: Derek "Duckie" Simpson, Michael Rose, Sandra "Puma" Jones, Sly Dunbar, Robbie Shakespeare
1979 – Showcase
1980 – Black Uhuru (Showcase re-edition)
1980 – Sinsemilla
1981 – Red
1982 – Chill Out
1983 – Guess Who's Coming to Dinner (Black Uhuru re-edition)
1983 – Anthem
1985 – Reggae Greats (compilation)

Group: Derrick "Duckie" Simpson, Delroy "Junior" Reid, Sandra "Puma" Jones, Sly Dunbar, Robbie Shakespeare
1986 – Brutal

Group: Derrick "Duckie" Simpson, Delroy "Junior" Reid, Olafunke
1987 – Positive

Group: Derrick "Duckie" Simpson, Garth Dennis, Don Carlos
1990 – Now
1991 – Iron Storm
1993 – Mystical Truth
1994 – Strongg

Group: Derrick "Duckie" Simpson, Jenifah Nyah, Andrew Bees
1998 – Unification
2001 – Dynasty
2018 – As the World Turns

Live / Dub albums
1982 – Uhuru in Dub
1982 – Tear It Up – Live (album and video)
1983 – The Dub Factor
1984 – Live
1986 – Brutal Dub
1987 – The Positive Dub
1988 – Live in New York City
1990 – Now Dub
1990 – Love Dub (Uhuru in Dub re-edition)
1992 – Iron Storm Dub
1993 – Mystical Truth Dub
1994 – Strongg Dubb
2000 – Live 1984
2001 – In Dub
2001 – Dubbin' It Live (summer 2001, at Paléo Festival)
2013 - Live in Germany 1981 (Rockpalast on CD and DVD)

References

Reggae discographies